Thirtymile is an unincorporated community in Gilliam County, Oregon, United States. It lies south of Condon and east of Oregon Route 19 along Thirtymile Creek, a tributary of the John Day River.

References

Unincorporated communities in Gilliam County, Oregon
Unincorporated communities in Oregon